Indiana University—Purdue University Columbus (IUPUC) is a public university in Columbus, Indiana. IUPUC offers degree programs from both Indiana University and Purdue University.

History
IUPUC was founded in 1970 as an extension of Indiana University–Purdue University Indianapolis (IUPUI). Originally, the extension had no single campus, instead offering classes in various locations throughout Columbus. An old airport building was converted to the first centralized campus building for IUPUC, but was soon renovated for academic use in 1985. In 1994, the chancellor of IUPUI renamed IUPUI Columbus to IUPUC.

IUPUC's first vice-chancellor, Paul Bippen, served in this capacity from 1977 until his retirement in 2003, when he was replaced by Nasser Paydar. In 2007, Jay Howard was named interim vice-chancellor. In 2009, Marwan Wafa was named the new vice-chancellor. IUPUC's most-senior executive title is vice-chancellor.

On August 12, 2022, the boards of trustees of both Purdue and IU announced that IUPUI will split into two separate universities, with completion of the split to be finished by the fall 2024 semester. According to Andrew Klein, the Interim Chancellor of IUPUI, IUPUC will continue to be a regional education center administered through IU-Indianapolis after the split is finalized. Only one program, the B.S. in mechanical engineering, is accredited through the Purdue School of Engineering and Technology at IUPUI, and as such will be administered through Purdue University.

Academics

Students can complete several Indiana University (IU) and Purdue University (PU) bachelor's and master's degrees in their entirety on IUPUC's shared Columbus campus. Students can also complete a substantial number of classes toward degrees not offered at IUPUC and then transfer to IUPUI or another IU or PU campus. The university's divisions include:
 Division of Business
 Division of Education
 Division of Liberal Arts
 Division of Mechanical Engineering
 Division of Health Sciences
 Division of Science
 University College
 Honors Program

IUPUC predominantly serves students in Bartholomew, Brown, Decatur, Jackson, Jefferson, Jennings, Johnson, Ripley and Shelby counties, as well as other areas in the largely rural south central and southeastern portion of Indiana. IUPUC also offers off-campus classes at the community learning center in Seymour.

IUPUC is one of the first academic institutions to innovate a cross-institutional and cross-discipline tutoring program through partnerships with Ivy Tech Community College and the Purdue Statewide Technology program. The Academic Resource Center (ARC) is a one-of-a-kind, one-stop tutoring operation for math, science, writing, public speaking, Spanish, and basic technology.

Athletics
The Indiana/Purdue–Columbus (IUPUC) athletic teams are called the Crimson Pride. The university is a member of the National Association of Intercollegiate Athletics (NAIA), primarily competing as an NAIA Independent within the Continental Athletic Conference starting in the 2022–23 academic year. IUPUC is in the process of applying for membership in the River States Conference (RSC).

IUPUC competes in four intercollegiate varsity sports: Men's sports include baseball and cross country; while women's sports include cross country and softball. IUPUC will be adding men’s and women’s soccer and women's volleyball for the 2023–24 seasons.

On October 24, 2022, IUPUC announced that they will join the River States Conference (RSC) beginning the 2023–24 school year.

References

External links 
 
 Official athletics website

Indiana University, Purdue C
Columbus
Purdue University
Educational institutions established in 1970
Columbus, Indiana
Joint-venture schools
Buildings and structures in Bartholomew County, Indiana
Education in Bartholomew County, Indiana